Zir-e Zard (also Romanized as Zīr-e Zard and Zir Zard; also known as Zīr-e Zard Boneh, Zīr Zard Boneh, and Zīr Zardineh) is a village in Howmeh-ye Sharqi Rural District, in the Central District of Ramhormoz County, Khuzestan Province, Iran. At the 2006 census, its population was 279, in 55 families.

References 

Populated places in Ramhormoz County